(The) Black Queen may refer to:

Architecture 
 The Black Queen, Lightning Ridge, a house, lamp museum and theatre made of 14,000 glass bottles in Lightning Ridge, NSW

Literature  
 Black Queen, a novel by Michael Morpurgo
 Black Queen (comics), a number of comic characters of the same name

Television 
 "The Black Queen" (House of the Dragon), an episode of the first season of House of the Dragon

Music

Bands  
 The Black Queen (band), an American band
 "Black Queen" Korean dance/dance cover group

Songs  	
"The Black Queen", a song by Paolo Conte from Razmataz 2000
 "Black Queen", a 1970 song on Stephen Stills (album)
 "The March Of The Black Queen", a 1974 song from by British rock band Queen from their Queen II album
 "Oh Black Queen, Oh You're Mine", a 1993 song by Greek metal band Nightfall and the first single.

Games 
 The black Queen chess piece
 The black Queen playing card
 Ogre Battle: The March of the Black Queen, a video game, whose name was inspired by two Queen songs